Dreaming Emmett is the first play by the Nobel-winning African-American writer Toni Morrison. First performed in 1986, the play was commissioned by the New York State Writers Institute at SUNY-Albany. The play's world premier, which was directed by Gilbert Moses, was on January 5, 1986 at Capital Repertory Theatre's Market Theater in Albany, New York. After its first production, Morrison reportedly destroyed all known video recordings of the play and copies of the script (although some critics describe copies existing but not being released by Morrison). Thus, all descriptions of the plot are reconstructed from contemporary reviews.

The play is a historical retelling of the life of Emmett Till, a 14-year-old African-American boy beaten to death in 1955 by a group of white men, and the subsequent trial and acquittal of his killers. Morrison uses Till's story to explore the "contemporary black urban youth['s] disproportionately high rate of death by violence".

The play received mixed reviews in its initial production. The play has a unique style and form. Margaret Croyden, in her review of Dreaming Emmett for the New York Times, notes the control of Till's imagination on the play's elements and complex structural motifs, such as a play within a play, and creation of a "nonnaturalistic" and "nonlinear" narrative.

In March 1986, Mario Cuomo and Kitty Carlisle Hart presented Morrison with the New York State Governor's Arts Award for Dreaming Emmett and other works.

Development

The play was commissioned by the New York State Writers Institute at SUNY-Albany to commemorate the first celebration of Martin Luther King, Jr. Day. The play is Morrison's first attempt at playwriting. When asked by an interviewer about her transition to writing plays, she said: "I keep asking Bill Kennedy to find one American who wrote novels first and then successful plays. Just one. And neither he nor I could come up with any one American. Even Henry James was a failure. He tried it three times and each time it was worse than the other. But I feel I have a strong point. I write good dialogue. It's theatrical. It moves. It just doesn't hang there." Morrison wrote the play in the midst of developing her 1987 novel Beloved (which would go on to win the Pulitzer Prize in 1988).

Production
The first and only full production of the play was directed by Morrison's friend Gilbert Moses. It ran at Capital Repertory Theatre from January 5, 1986 to February 2. The cast included Joseph C. Phillips (Emmett), Peggy Cowles (Princess), Mel Winkler (Eustace), Herb Downer (George), Beatrice Winde (Ma), Frank Stoeger (Major), Larry Golden (Buck) and Lorraine Toussaint (Tamara). 
Production crew included Dale F. Jordan (Scenic and Lighting Designer), Willa Shalit (Mask Design), Lloyd K. Waiwaiole (Costume Design), Constance Valis Hill (Mask/Movement), Kevin Bartlett (Sound Design/Composer), Patricia Frey (Production Stage Manager), David Yergan (Technical Director) and Janet Storck (Properties Master).

References

Further reading

African-American plays
Emmett Till in fiction
1986 plays
Works by Toni Morrison